Gu Jun (born 3 January 1975) is a Chinese former badminton player.

Career
Gu and her regular partner Ge Fei were the world's dominant women's doubles team from the mid-1990s to their retirement after the 2000 Olympics. They won over thirty top tier international tournaments together, including two Olympic competitions and two IBF World Championships (which were then held biennially). They helped China to regain the Uber Cup (women's world team trophy) from Indonesia in 1998, and to retain the Cup in 2000. Gu Jun was elected to the World Badminton Hall of Fame in 2008.

Summer Olympics
Gu competed in the Atlanta 1996 Olympics in the women's doubles with Ge Fei. They won the gold medal by beating Gil Young-ah and Jang Hye-ock of South Korea 15–5, 15–5 in the final match.

Gu and Ge successfully defended their women's doubles title in the Sydney 2000 Olympics. They won by the same score as 1996, this time against their compatriots Huang Nanyan and Yang Wei.

Achievements

Olympic Games 
Women's doubles

World Championships 
Women's doubles

World Cup 
Women's doubles

Mixed doubles

Asian Games 
Women's doubles

Asian Championships 
Women's doubles

Asian Cup 
Women's doubles

World Junior Championships 
The Bimantara World Junior Championships was an international invitation badminton tournament for junior players. It was held in Jakarta, Indonesia from 1987 to 1991.

Girls' doubles

Mixed doubles

IBF World Grand Prix 
The World Badminton Grand Prix sanctioned by International Badminton Federation (IBF) from 1983 to 2006.

Women's doubles

IBF International 
Women's singles

Women's doubles

References
badmintoncn.com
European results

All England champions 1899-2007

External links
 
 
 
 

1975 births
Living people
Sportspeople from Wuxi
Badminton players from Jiangsu
Chinese female badminton players
Badminton players at the 1996 Summer Olympics
Badminton players at the 2000 Summer Olympics
Olympic badminton players of China
Olympic gold medalists for China
Olympic medalists in badminton
Medalists at the 2000 Summer Olympics
Medalists at the 1996 Summer Olympics
Badminton players at the 1994 Asian Games
Badminton players at the 1998 Asian Games
Asian Games gold medalists for China
Asian Games bronze medalists for China
Asian Games medalists in badminton
Medalists at the 1994 Asian Games
Medalists at the 1998 Asian Games
World No. 1 badminton players
Nanjing Sport Institute alumni
21st-century Chinese women
20th-century Chinese women